Fonthill or Font Hill may refer to:
Fonthill Bishop, village in Wiltshire, England
Fonthill Gifford, village in Wiltshire, England
Fonthill Abbey, Fonthill Lake and Fonthill Grottoes are located between Fonthill Bishop and Fonthill Gifford
Fonthill, Kentucky, unincorporated community in the United States
Fonthill, Ontario, community in the town of Pelham, Ontario, Canada
Fonthill (house), house in Doylestown, Pennsylvania, United States
Fonthill Castle and the Administration Building of the College of Mount St. Vincent, in The Bronx, New York, New York
Fonthill, the name of an estate belonging to United States stage actor Edwin Forrest
Font Hill Beach, beach in Jamaica
Font Hill Manor, historic slave plantation in Maryland, United States